Agassiz Peak is the second-highest mountain in the U.S. state of Arizona at . It is located north of Flagstaff, Arizona in the San Francisco Peaks. It is in the Kachina Peaks Wilderness on the Coconino National Forest. The peak was named in honor of Louis Agassiz, a Swiss-born American biologist and geologist. 

Many visitors to Flagstaff incorrectly assume that Agassiz Peak is Humphreys Peak, the state high point.  This is because Agassiz is between Humphreys and Flagstaff, blocking the view of Humphreys from town.

The mountain is only open to climbers in the winter when it is covered in snow. Hiking above treeline at other times is illegal due to the "threatened with critical habitat" status of the San Francisco Peaks groundsel (Senecio franciscanus).

At a latitude of 35°19'33"N, Agassiz Peak is the southernmost mountain peak in the contiguous United States which rises to a height of more than 12,000 feet above sea level.

See also
 List of mountains and hills of Arizona by height

References

External links

Volcanoes of Arizona
Landforms of Coconino County, Arizona
Coconino National Forest
Mountains of Coconino County, Arizona
North American 3000 m summits